The 1852 United States presidential election in New Hampshire took place on November 2, 1852, as part of the 1852 United States presidential election. Voters chose five representatives, or electors to the Electoral College, who voted for President and Vice President.

New Hampshire voted for the Democratic candidate, Franklin Pierce, over the Whig Party candidate, Winfield Scott. Pierce won his home state by a margin of 25.76%. His margin of victory in New Hampshire is the second largest for a Democrat, surpassed only by Lyndon B. Johnson's 27.78% in 1964.

Both Pierce and Free Soil Party candidate John P. Hale were from New Hampshire. Pierce had been born in Hillsborough while Hale was born in Rochester.

This would be the last election when New Hampshire voted for the Democratic Party until Woodrow Wilson won it in 1912 with a narrow plurality, as the anti-slavery Republican Party would monopolize the state at a presidential level between 1856 and 1908. It was to also be the last election that a Democrat won a majority of the vote in the state until Franklin D. Roosevelt in 1940. Cheshire County would indeed never again vote Democratic until supporting Lyndon Johnson in 1964, and Sullivan County would not do so for a Democrat until Wilson in 1916. This would also be the last time a Democrat would carry every single county until Barack Obama in 2008.

Results

See also
 United States presidential elections in New Hampshire

References

New Hampshire
1852
1852 New Hampshire elections